At the Battle of Taginae (also known as the Battle of Busta Gallorum) in June/July 552, the forces of the Byzantine Empire under Narses broke the power of the Ostrogoths in Italy, and paved the way for the temporary Byzantine reconquest of the Italian Peninsula.

Prelude
From as early as 549 the Emperor Justinian I had planned to dispatch a major army to Italy to conclude the protracted war with the Ostrogoths initiated in 535. During 550–51 a large expeditionary force totaling 20,000 or possibly 25,000 men was gradually assembled at Salona on the Adriatic, comprising regular Byzantine units and a large contingent of foreign allies, notably Lombards, Heruls, and Bulgars. The imperial chamberlain (cubicularius) Narses was appointed to command in mid 551. The following spring Narses led this Byzantine army around the coast of the Adriatic as far as Ancona, and then turned inland aiming to march down the Via Flaminia to Rome.

Deployment
At a place known as Busta Gallorum (lit. "tombs of the Gauls"), near the village of Taginae or Tadinae (traditionally located somewhere to the north of modern Gualdo Tadino), the Byzantines encountered the Ostrogothic army commanded by King Totila, who had been advancing to intercept them. Finding himself considerably outnumbered, Totila ostensibly entered into negotiations while planning a surprise attack, but Narses was not fooled by this stratagem.

Although he enjoyed superiority in numbers, Narses deployed his army in a strong defensive position. In the centre he massed the large body of Germanic mercenaries dismounted in a dense formation and placed the Byzantine troops to either side. On each wing he stationed 4,000 foot-archers.

Battle
Totila initially attempted to outflank his opponent by seizing a small hill on the Byzantine left which dominated the only route to the rear of the Byzantine line, but some of the Byzantine infantry deployed in a compact well-shielded formation managed to beat off successive attacks of the Ostrogothic cavalry.

Having failed to turn Narses' position, and expecting 2,000 reinforcements from Teia, Totila used various expedients to delay the battle, including disingenuous offers of negotiation and duels enacted between the battle-lines. In one such occasion, Totila sent a Byzantine deserter named Coccas out to challenge any Byzantine to single combat. Coccas was large and immensely strong. He had a reputation among the Goths as a ruthless and powerful fighter. An Armenian named Anzalas, one of Narses' bodyguards, answered the challenge. Coccas charged at Anzalas, but at the last moment, Anzalas swerved his horse and stabbed the Gothic champion in the side. It was not the most auspicious omen for the Ostrogoths.

However, the Ostrogothic king had another delaying tactic. Both armies watched as Totila, dressed in shining purple and gold armor, and riding a huge stallion, cantered out towards the space between the two large armies. His horse went circles, reared, pirouetted, and ran backwards as Totila tossed his lance into the air and caught it. At last, he rode back to his own army and changed into battle armor. Teia had arrived.

His reinforcements having arrived, Totila broke formation and retired for lunch. Narses, wary of a possible ruse, permitted his troops to refresh themselves without leaving their positions. Totila, apparently hoping to take his enemy by surprise, launched a sudden large-scale mounted assault upon the Byzantine center. Ancient and modern authors have accused him of folly, but Totila probably sought to close with the enemy as fast as possible in order to avoid the effects of the formidable Byzantine archers. The Byzantines were prepared for such a move, however, and the archers massed on the flanks to incline their front towards the center so that his battle-line became crescent-shaped. Caught in the enfilading fire from both sides, the Ostrogothic cavalry sustained high casualties and their attack faltered. The course and duration of the subsequent battle are uncertain, but towards early evening Narses ordered a general advance, and the Ostrogoths broke and fled. Although accounts vary, it was probably during the subsequent rout that Totila was killed.

Aftermath
Narses proceeded to Rome which fell with limited resistance. The Ostrogoths regrouped under Totila's successor Teia, but suffered a final defeat at the Battle of Mons Lactarius (near Mount Vesuvius) and thereafter were most likely absorbed into the Lombards, another Germanic tribe that invaded Italy in the 6th century.

References

Sources

External links 
 Locations of this battle and battle of Mons Lactarius

Taginae
Taginae
Taginae
Taginae
Taginae
Taginae
550s in the Byzantine Empire
552